The name Moscow Ballet has commonly been applied to a number of different ballet companies, which include:
Moscow Ballet (United States), a Russian ballet company. The Moscow Ballet tours annually in the United States with its Great Russian Nutcracker production.
The Bolshoi Ballet, based in Moscow, Russia has often been referred to generically as "The Moscow Ballet".
A "Moscow Ballet", founded in 1979, gained publicity in 1987 when a dancer, Andrei Ustinov, defected during the company’s first U.S. tour. Its artistic director is Vyacheslav Gordeyev, previously of the Bolshoi Ballet. Its 1987 tour was seen by an estimated 150,000 people.

References

Ballet companies in Russia